Once Upon a Snowman is a 2020 American computer-animated fantasy short film produced by Walt Disney Animation Studios and directed by Dan Abraham and Trent Correy. It premiered on the streaming service Disney+ on October 23, 2020.

Taking place during the events of Frozen (2013), it follows Olaf right after he was created by Elsa, before he met Anna, Kristoff, and Sven.

Plot
During Elsa's song "Let It Go", Olaf the snowman is brought to life. Before he can do anything however, Elsa releases her cloak which flies and knocks him down the mountain side until he crashes into a tree. Not knowing who he is, or why he is alive, Olaf decides to find an identity for himself. He comes upon Wandering Oaken's Trading Post and Sauna (where Kristoff can be heard singing "Reindeer(s) Are Better Than People" from the barn) and gets flattened by the front door by Anna who exits not noticing him and carrying a bag of carrots (which she will eventually give to Kristoff and Sven as payment).
 
Olaf enters the Post and meets Oaken. Olaf asks for a nose, possibly a carrot, for his face, but Oaken explains that he sold the last batch and decides to help him out by trying a variety of other objects. One of the objects is an old fashioned view master that features images of "Summer". Olaf is immediately taken by it and wants to experience it before settling on a sausage for his nose.
 
As Olaf happily leaves with his new nose, a pack of wolves suddenly appear and begin to chase him through the snowy tundra, during which Anna and Kristoff can be heard arguing with each other over the concept of love. Olaf passes by them, again unnoticed, which gets the wolves to suddenly shift their attention to them. Olaf continues to slide and witnesses Anna, Kristoff and Sven making a leap across the gorge while ditching their sleigh. Olaf makes it to the bottom where he spots one of the carrots that gets dropped, but it gets crushed by the sleigh.
 
Olaf's sausage nose breaks, which saddens him. Upon seeing one of the wolves whimpering pitifully at his nose, Olaf gives it to him, believing that he needs it more than him. The wolf happily licks him before leaving. Olaf comments that it felt like a warm hug to which suddenly causes him to remember Anna and Elsa's time playing together as children. Finally realizing who he is, he comments "I'm Olaf and I like warm hugs."
 
During the credits, Olaf is seen coming across Anna, Kristoff and Sven who will eventually give him his carrot nose.

Cast
Josh Gad as Olaf
Kristen Bell as Anna (archive audio from the first film)
Livvy Stubenrauch as Young Anna (archive audio from the first film)
Idina Menzel as Elsa (archive audio from the first film)
Eva Bella as Young Elsa (archive audio from the first film)
Jonathan Groff as Kristoff (archive audio from the first film)
Chris Williams as Oaken
Frank Welker as Sven

Track listing
"Let It Go" by Idina Menzel
"Reindeer(s) Are Better Than People" by Jonathan Groff
"In Summer" by Josh Gad
"Do You Want to Build a Snowman?" Kristen Bell & Idina Menzel

Reception

Critical response 
Ryan Britt of Fatherly stated that Once Upon a Snowman is a refreshing Christmas short, and said that it manages to provide more amusement than expected regarding its length. Drew Taylor of Collider gave the short film an A rating, stated that the short movie's humor manages to be entertaining through its narrative, acclaimed Josh Gad's portrayal as Olaf, and found the animation very attractive. Emily Ashby of Common Sense Media rated the film 5 out of 5 stars, praised the short film for depicting curiosity and self-discovery through Olaf, while complimenting the portrayal of optimism and perseverance through the short movie. W. Andrew Powell of TheGATE.ca rated Once Upon a Snowman 4 out of 5 stars, found that Gad manages to provide a very well portrayal of Olaf, while complimenting the humor through the narrative, but stated that the movie could have last longer. Matt Fowler of IGN gave the short film a 6 out of 10 rating, complimented Gad's performance and the story, but found that the short does not bring anything substantial to the Frozen franchise.

Accolades 
The short is nominated for Outstanding Short Form Animated Program at the 73rd Primetime Emmy Awards.

Notes

References

External links

 

2020 comedy films
2020 computer-animated films
2020 short films
2020s musical comedy films
American animated fantasy films
American animated featurettes
American fantasy comedy films
American musical comedy films
American musical fantasy films
American animated comedy films
Animated musical films
2020s Disney animated short films
Disney+ original films
2020s English-language films
Films produced by Peter Del Vecho
Films scored by Christophe Beck
Films set in Scandinavia
Frozen (franchise) shorts
Animated films about sisters